Demetri (born Matta Khoury), titular Bishop of Jableh, was an auxiliary bishop of the Antiochian Orthodox Christian Archdiocese of North America from  to .

Career
He received a Bachelor of Arts degree in Philosophy and Religion in 1974 and a Master of Divinity degree in 1978, both from Hellenic College Holy Cross Greek Orthodox School of Theology.

He served as pastor at St. George, Boston, and at St. Mary, Cambridge. After serving at St. George, Allentown, Pennsylvania, he then served as dean at St. Nicholas Cathedral, Brooklyn, New York, and at St. George Cathedral, Coral Gables, Florida. On , he was consecrated as titular bishop of Jableh by Patriarch Ignatius IV of Antioch at the Mariamite Cathedral of Damascus. He served as an auxiliary bishop in the Antiochian Orthodox Christian Archdiocese of North America at the chancery in Toledo, Ohio until .

Books

References

External link
 

1948 births
Bishops of the Greek Orthodox Church of Antioch
Eastern Orthodox bishops in the United States
Living people